Donald McKellow (7 May 1925 – 4 May 2022) was a British cyclist. He competed in the 1,000 metres time trial event at the 1952 Summer Olympics.

As of 2017, McKellow resided in Hillingdon, London with his wife Beryl. They ran dance classes together and were known as Mr and Mrs Melody.

References

External links
 

1925 births
2022 deaths
British male cyclists
Cyclists at the 1952 Summer Olympics
Olympic cyclists of Great Britain
Cyclists from Greater London